KOFE (1240 AM) is a radio station  broadcasting a classic hits format. Licensed to St. Maries, Idaho, United States, the station is currently owned by Theresa Plank, and features programming from ABC Radio.

References

External links

OFE
Classic hits radio stations in the United States
Radio stations established in 1970
1970 establishments in Idaho